Taras Pinchuk (born 27 April 1989) is a professional Ukrainian football defender.

He is product of FC Dynamo Kyiv sportive school. He became on loan for Zirka Kirovohrad in Ukrainian First League from July 2010.

In January 2014 he became a free agent.

References

External links 

1989 births
Living people
Footballers from Kyiv
Ukrainian footballers
FC Dynamo-2 Kyiv players
FC Dynamo-3 Kyiv players
FC Zirka Kropyvnytskyi players
FC Helios Kharkiv players
FC Obolon-Brovar Kyiv players
Association football defenders
PFC Sumy players
NK Veres Rivne players
FC Livyi Bereh Kyiv players
Ukrainian Second League players
Ukrainian First League players
Ukraine youth international footballers
Ukraine student international footballers